USS Nokomis (SP-609) was a yacht purchased by the U.S. Navy during World War I. The yacht was purchased from Horace E. Dodge of Detroit, Michigan after he had the yacht luxuriously fitted out but before he could make use of his second Nokomis — the first having already gone into service.

She was outfitted as a patrol craft with 3-inch guns, and assigned to protect commercial shipping in the North Atlantic Ocean from German submarines and Q-ships. Post-war she was returned to the U.S. and decommissioned. Subsequently, she was placed back into service as a Navy survey vessel, a role she maintained for nearly two decades before again being decommissioned and struck from the Navy List in 1938.

The vessel was loaned to the Coast Guard, which assigned the name Bodkin, and was undergoing conversion to a sub chaser in 1943 until the submarine threat lessened and the conversion was stopped. The hulk was towed to Mallows Bay on Maryland's shore of the Potomac River and scrapped in June 1944. The former Nokomis was the only warship among the hulks of burned and salvaged World War I commercial vessels at the "graveyard" and the last to be scrapped there.

Yacht 
Nokomis II was a steam yacht designed by Henry J. Gielow of Gielow & Orr built as hull 360 by Pusey & Jones, Wilmington, Delaware for Horace E. Dodge of Detroit, Michigan launched 27 December 1916.  Trials took place 28 April 1917. Though purchased by the Navy before significant operation as a private yacht the vessel was briefly assigned the official number 214877.

Confusion with Nokomis (1914)
This was the second yacht of the name and the second designed by Gielow for Dodge. The first Nokomis was purchased by the Navy for $140,000 from Dodge and delivered to the Navy on 9 May 1917.

It is not unusual to see the 1914 build date associated with the specific characteristics of the 1916 Nokomis II. This is compounded by the fact that the unique official number, 214877 in the case of Nokomis II, usually for the entire lifetime of a vessel, through name and ownership changes, "died" with naval service. Confusion may be aided by the fact the Navy, Dictionary of American Naval Fighting Ships for example, refers to the yacht Nokomis II as the Navy's Nokomis I. The first Nokomis was still in the register as Dupont, owned by the state or Maryland, as late as 1961.

Construction
Nokomis II was fitted out with special interior design for each space in luxurious style and accepted by Dodge in June 1917. Dodge had specified that the new yacht be fully sea going and incorporate the latest naval architecture and design as well as that all the interior decor and furnishings be specially designed to artistically harmonize without being ornate. The yacht was acquired by the Navy before completion and the only chance Dodge had to sail Nokomis was to deliver the vessel to the Navy.

The yacht was flush decked with a steel hull. A steel deck house,  in length and  headroom, was covered by a shade deck above extending the width of the ship that provided a promenade. The forward portion of the deck house contained a pantry on the starboard side with staterooms for the stewards on the port side. Flanking that casing to starboard was a vestibule to the main deck, toilet, and barber shop. Flanking to port were staterooms for engineers and a laundry.

On the upper deck were two structures. From photographs the open bridge was atop the forward house.

On the berthing deck below the crew's quarters lay forward with crew's bath aft of the collision bulkhead and folding bunks in a  space aft of the bathroom. Aft of the bunkroom were eleven staterooms and a wardroom for ship's officers occupying  of length and full width of the vessel. Aft of the officers space were separate galleys, one for the crew and one for the owner.

Babcock & Wilcox water tube type boilers provided steam with two triple expansion, three cylinder engines driving the twin screws.  Steam also drove electrical generating sets.  The equipment was designed so that either boiler could provide steam to either engine independently so that 80% of full speed could be maintained on either.  Fuel capacity was 350 tons of coal carried in bunkers athwartship and alongside the boiler room.  Ship's auxiliaries were electrical powered and forced air heating and cooling was available when natural ventilation was not desirable.  A feature of the yacht was its seven boats.  Those included a  express launch, a  service launch, two  power launches, a power lifeboat and two regular lifeboats.

Dodge did not give up after losing his second and unused yacht to the Navy. A third, apparently initially adding to the Nokomis line of yachts, larger one  designed by Gielow was being built in 1920 by the Great Lakes Engineering Works, Detroit; however, that vessel ended up being named Delphine (1921) instead of carrying on the tradition.

World War I service 
The yacht was purchased from Dodge 1 June 1917 for $510,000 retaining the civilian name to officially become the Navy's first Nokomis 19 November 1917. The ship was commissioned at Philadelphia, Pennsylvania, on 3 December 1917.

French escort duty 
After fitting out at Philadelphia Nokomis sailed for Bermuda 19 December with a French submarine chaser in tow. She departed Bermuda for Brest, France, 8 January 1918, stopping en route at the Azores and Leixões, Portugal. The expansion of U.S. Naval forces in France and increase in the escort duty in French waters resulted in Nokomis being among the smaller and slower vessels of less military value transferred to serve convoys using the Gironde River with a base in Rochefort, a French naval base north of the Gironde. Nokomis reported at Rochefort 11 March 1918. The five other former yachts withstood the constant escort duty well, but Nokomis is noted as an exception. Nokomis spent the rest of the conflict on patrol and escort duty off western France, and remained in European waters for several months after the November 1918 Armistice brought an end to the fighting and end of wartime duty in 1919. Aboard were some six African Americans, one cook and the others mess attendants, relegated to the role of servants in the segregated Navy.

Nokomis returned to the United States in August, was reclassified PY–6 in 1920, and decommissioned at New York City 25 February 1921. The yacht was outfitted as a ship's tender for the Naval Governor of Santo Domingo in July 1921 but did not assume this duty.

Postwar Navy survey ship 
On 26 March 1924, under command of Royal E. Ingersoll, Nokomis was fitted out as a survey ship and surveyed in the Cuban–Haitian area, making new charts of the north coast of Cuba. The coastline was determined largely by aerial photography, taken by an amphibian Loening OL-2, in the first extensive use of aircraft in surveying. Under direction of the Hydrographic Office she conducted surveys in Mexican and Caribbean waters. Benjamin Dutton, Jr., an expert in navigation who had two Navy survey ships named in his honor, was in command during a part of this period.

During 1935 in a cooperative effort with Instituto Geografico de Colombia Nokomis surveyed Cartagena Bay .

Nokomis decommissioned 15 February 1938 and was struck from the Navy Register 25 May 1938.

Fate 
The Navy loaned the former naval vessel to the United States Coast Guard in 1943 which assigned the name Bodkin. The vessel was undergoing conversion at the Coast Guard Yard at Curtis Creek, Maryland into a submarine chaser. Work was suspended, after $150,000 in costs, due to lessening of the submarine threat. Bethlehem Steel Company was directed to salvage the metals that could be remelted and the hulk was taken to Mallows Bay to be the only warship among the many World War I hulks there. On 22 June 1944 Bethlehem scrapped the hulk as one of the last operations at the bay.

Footnotes

References

Sources

External links
Nokomis photographs — Pusey and Jones Corporation photograph collection (Hagley Museum and Library, Wilmington, DE)
"Nokomis A Floating Palace" (The Rudder, July 1917) Interior design and engines with photographs.
Nokomis (PY 6 ex-SP-609) at NavSource

1916 ships
Steam yachts
Ships built by Pusey and Jones
World War I patrol vessels of the United States
Survey ships of the United States Navy
Dodge family